Matt Hern is a community organizer, independent scholar, writer and activist based in East Vancouver, British Columbia who is known for his work in radical urbanism, community development, ecology and alternative forms of education.
He has founded a wide range of community projects, initiatives and institutions. He is currently the co-founder and co-director of Solid State Community Industries which is building a network of workers' co-operatives with youth from newcomer and racialized families.
His writing has been published on all six continents and translated into fourteen languages.

Early life and education 

Hern was born in Victoria and grew up in rural British Columbia. After attending Queen’s University in Kingston, Ontario, he briefly worked in journalism in New York City before moving to East Vancouver working as a sportswriter for a number of years. Hern was a student at the Institute for Social Ecology in Plainfield, Vermont where he completed an MA, and shortly after became a faculty member. Hern holds a PhD in Urban Studies.

Career 
Hern is well known for his books, articles and lectures, and he speaks widely in various forums and media. His 2016 book What a City is For (MIT Press) interrogates and charts the ongoing aggressive dispersal of Portland’s Black community in the context of perhaps North America’s most liberal city. In 2018 Hern published Global Warming and the Sweetness of Life: In Search of an Ecological Future (MIT Press, 2018). The book is co-authored with Am Johal and features cartoons and drawings by Joe Sacco. The book charts multiple trips through the tar sands of northern Alberta and affected Indigenous communities. His 2019 title On this Patch of Grass: City Parks on Occupied Land was co-authored with Selena, Sadie and Daisy Couture.

Hern has published seven earlier books, including: One Game at a Time (AK Press, 2014) which is a radical critique and defense of sports, Common Ground in a Liquid City: Essays in Defense of an Urban Future (AK Press, 2009) which explores participatory urbanism in the context of his home city, Field Day (New Star, 2003), and Watch Yourself (New Star, 2007). He has also edited three collections including: Stay Solid: A Radical Handbook for Youth (AK Press, 2013), Everywhere All The Time (AK Press, 2008), and Deschooling Our Lives (New Star, 1996).

Community organizing 
Running parallel to his scholarship and writing, Hern has a long history of founding and directing community institutions.  These include alternative community schools, youth centres, youth exchanges and a solidarity-economy incubator. Currently Hern is directing a new project he has co-founded: Solid State Industries, a creative production co-operative and creative hub with newcomer and racialized migrant youth. The project derives inspiration from co-operative and autonomist movements, and is building a network of youth run and owned workers co-operatives.

Hern has also founded a number of other community projects and initiatives, the best-known of which is Car-Free Day Vancouver. he founded it in 2005, shepherded its growth to four major Vancouver neighbourhoods and an annual event that draws 400,000 people annually to call for an ecological city.

In 2021, Solid State Industries was featured in an episode of the CTV reality series Holmes Family Effect.

Personal 
Hern lives in East Vancouver with his partner, children and extended family.

Selected publications
 Deschooling Our Lives, New Society Publishers, 1996. (Editor).
 Field Day: Getting Society Out of School, New Star Books, 2003.
 Watch Yourself: Why Safer Isn't Always Better, New Star Books, 2007.
 Everywhere All the Time: A New Deschooling Reader, AK Press, 2008. (Editor).
 Common Ground in a Liquid City: Essays in Defense of an Urban Future, AK Press, 2009.
 Stay Solid: A Radical Handbook for Youth. AK Press, 2012. (Editor).
 One Game at a Time: Why Sports Matter, AK Press, 2013.
 What a City is For: Remaking the Politics of Displacement, MIT Press, 2016
 Global Warming and the Sweetness of Life: A Tar Sands Tale, MIT Press 2018
 On this Patch of Grass: City Parks on Occupied Land, Fernwood Press, 2019

References

Homeschooling advocates
Living people
Queen's University at Kingston alumni
1968 births
Union Institute & University alumni
People from Victoria, British Columbia